The Guamira River flows through Hato Mayor Province of the Dominican Republic.

References

Rivers of the Dominican Republic